Simoeis or Simois  ( Simóeis) was a river of the Trojan plain, now called the Dümruk Su (Dümrek Çayı), and the name of its god in Greek mythology.

River
The Simoeis was a small river of the ancient Troad, having its source in Mount Ida, or more accurately in Mount Cotylus, which passed by Troy, joined the Scamander River below that city. This river is frequently spoken of in the Iliad, and described as a rapid mountain torrent. The river is also noted by the ancient geographers Strabo, Ptolemy, Stephanus of Byzantium, Pomponius Mela, and Pliny the Elder. Its present course is so altered that it is no longer a tributary of the Scamander, but flows directly into the Hellespont.

Family 
Like other river-gods, Simoeis was the son of Oceanus and Tethys. Simoeis had two daughters who were married into the Trojan royal family. One daughter, Astyoche, was married to Erichthonius, and the other daughter, Hieromneme was the wife of Assaracus.

Mythology 
When the gods took sides in the Trojan War, Simoeis supported the Trojans. Scamander, another river who also supported the Trojans, called upon Simoeis for help in his battle against Achilles:"Come to my aid with all speed, fill your streams with water from your springs, stir up all your torrents, stand high in a great wave, and rouse a mighty roar of timbers and rocks, so we can stop this savage man who in his strength is raging like the gods." (Iliad, 21.311-15).Before Simoeis could respond, Hephaestus was able to save Achilles by subduing Scamander with flame.

Trojan descendants

References 

 March, J. Cassell's Dictionary Of Classical Mythology. London, 1999.

Ancient Greek geography
Potamoi
Locations in the Iliad